Brugère is a surname. Notable people with the surname include:

 Fabienne Brugère (born in 1964), French philosopher, academic
 Joseph Brugère (1841–1918), French general
 Louis-Frédéric Brugère (1823–1888), Roman Catholic professor of apologetics and church history
 Raymond Brugère (1885–1966), French diplomat

See also
 Bruyère (disambiguation)

French-language surnames